The GET City Optimized Managed Electric Transport (COMET) is an electric minibus developed by American firm Pangea Motors and manufactured and distributed by Global Electric Transport.

Design
Often characterized as an electric jeepney (e-jeep) in the Philippines, the City Optimized Managed Electric Transport (COMET) was designed specifically to fulfill the public transportation needs of Metro Manila, as a potential replacement for traditional open-air jeepneys, which are also noted as a major contributor to air pollution in the metropolis. The COMET was designed by United States-based Pangea Motors and is distributed and manufactured by Global Electric Transport (GET). A team from the United States went to the Philippines as part of the design process for the COMET minibus.

Unlike traditional jeepneys, the COMET has the capability to accommodate standing passengers and its doors are positioned on the sides instead in the back. It is also powered by lithium-ion batteries instead of diesel. GET would also allow COMET owners to customized the exterior of the vehicles similar to the kitschy jeepney art of its conventional counterparts.

Use in public transport
The COMET, is touted as a replacement to traditional jeepneys in the Philippines which plies routes in urban centers. In contrast to traditional jeepneys, where passengers could board and alight at any point in a given route in practice; COMETs were only allowed to do so at certain designated stops. The COMETs' public transport operations are managed by a Command Center, ran by Pangea Philippines which could track individual COMETs using GPS installed on each vehicle. Fares are paid through a dedicated contactless smart card by GET.

The COMET was first used for public transport in Quezon City in September 2014. The vehicle was relaunched on September 3, 2015 with changes made to increase its electrical range and adjustments to its air suspension. In December 2021, operations started in Valenzuela.

The Light Rail Manila Corp. along with GET also opened routes in Metro Manila.

References

Buses of the United States
Buses of the Philippines
Public transportation in the Philippines
Electric vehicles
Minibuses
Jeepneys